Parafestuca is a genus of plants in the grass family. The only known species is Parafestuca albida, found only on the Portuguese Island of Madeira in the North Atlantic.

References

Pooideae
Monotypic Poaceae genera
Flora of Madeira
Endemic flora of Madeira